Félix Fernández may refer to:

 Félix Fernández (actor) (1897–1966), Spanish actor
 Félix Fernández (footballer) (born 1967), Mexican footballer
 Félix Fernández (water polo) (born 1964), Spanish Olympic water polo player
 Félix Omar Fernández (born 1976), Puerto Rican track and field athlete